Sophistical Refutations is a text in Aristotle's Organon in which he identified thirteen fallacies. According to Aristotle, this is the first work to treat the subject of deductive reasoning in ancient Greece (Soph. Ref., 34, 183b34 ff.).

Overview
On Sophistical Refutations consists of 34 chapters. The book naturally falls in two parts: chapters concerned with tactics for the Questioner (3–8 and 12–15) and chapters concerned with tactics for the Answerer (16–32). Besides, there is an introduction (1–2), an interlude (9–11), and a conclusion (33–34).

Fallacies identified 
The fallacies Aristotle identifies in Chapter 4 (formal fallacies) and 5 (informal fallacies) of this book are the following:

Fallacies in the language or formal fallacies (in dictionem)
 Equivocation
 Amphibology
 Composition
 Division
 Accent
 Figure of speech or form of expression

Fallacies not in the language or informal fallacies (extra dictionem)

Footnotes

References

External links
 
 HTML Greek text via Greco interattivo
 Translated by W. A. Pickard-Cambridge
 
 ChangingMinds.org: "Aristotle's 13 fallacies"
 

Works by Aristotle
Logic literature